Sons of God (literally: "sons of the Elohim") is a phrase used in the Tanakh or Old Testament and in Christian Apocrypha. The phrase is also used in Kabbalah where bene elohim are part of different Jewish angelic hierarchies.

Hebrew Bible

Genesis 6

The first mention of "sons of God" in the Hebrew Bible occurs at Genesis 6:1–4. In terms of literary-historical origin, this phrase is typically associated with the Jahwist tradition.

That the "sons of God" were separate enough from the "daughters of men" that they warranted such a distinction, has spawned millennia's worth of debate regarding the meaning of the term. Historically, in Jewish thought, this passage has had many interpretations. Here are three:

 Offspring of Seth: The first references to the offspring of Seth rebelling from God and mingling with the daughters of Cain are found in Christian and rabbinic literature from the second century CE onwards e.g. Rabbi Shimon bar Yochai, Origen, Augustine of Hippo, Julius Africanus, and the Letters attributed to St. Clement. It is also the view expressed in the modern canonical Amharic Ethiopian Orthodox Bible. In Judaism "Sons of God" usually refers to the righteous, i.e. the children of Seth.
 Angels: All of the earliest sources interpret the "sons of God" as angels. From the third century BCE onwards, references are found in the Enochic literature, the Dead Sea Scrolls (the Genesis Apocryphon, the Damascus Document, 4Q180), Jubilees, the Testament of Reuben, 2 Baruch, Josephus, and the book of Jude (compare with 2 Peter 2). This is also the meaning of the only two identical occurrences of bene ha elohim in the Hebrew Bible (Job 1:6 and 2:1), and of the most closely related expressions (refer to the list above). In the Septuagint, the interpretive reading "angels" is found in Codex Alexandrinus, one of four main witnesses to the Greek text.
 Deified kings/Tyrant judges: There is also a large consensus within the scholarly community, that the "sons of God" were simply the deified kings of the various Canaanite city states. These would be the same Canaanite city states that the later proto-Israelites would eventually flee, and who would eventually resettle in the Judean highlands.

Ugaritic text
Claus Westermann claims that the text of Genesis 6 is based on an Ugaritic urtext. In Ugaritic, a cognate phrase is bn 'il. This may occur in the Ugaritic Baal Cycle.

 KTU² 1.40 demonstrates the use of bn il to mean "sons of gods".
 KTU² 1.65 (which may be a scribal exercise) uses bn il three times in succession: il bn il / dr bn il / mphrt bn il "El, the sons of gods, the circle of the sons of gods / the totality of the sons of gods."

The phrase bn ilm ("sons of the gods") is also attested in Ugaritic texts, as is the phrase phr bn ilm ("assembly of the sons of the gods").

Elsewhere in the Ugarit corpus it is suggested that the bn ilm were the 70 sons of Asherah and El, who were the titulary deities of the people of the known world, and their "hieros gamos" marriage with the daughters of men gave rise to their rulers. There is evidence in 2 Samuel 7 that this may have been the case also in Israel.

Late text
J. Scharbert associates Genesis 6:1–4 with the Priestly source and the final redaction of the Pentateuch. On this basis, he assigns the text to later editorial activity. Rüdiger Bartelmus sees only Genesis 6:3 as a late insertion.

Józef Milik and Matthew Black advanced the view of a late text addition to a text dependent on post-exilic, non-canonical tradition, such as the legend of the Watchers from the pseudepigraphic version of the Book of Enoch.

Translations
Different source versions of Genesis 6:1–4 vary in their use of "sons of God". Some manuscripts of the Septuagint have emendations to read "sons of God" as "angels". Codex Vaticanus contains "angels" originally. In Codex Alexandrinus "sons of God" has been omitted and replaced by "angels". This reading of Angels is further confirmed by Augustine in his work City of God where he speaks of both variants in book 15 chapter 23. The Peshitta reads "sons of God". Furthermore the Vulgate goes for the literal filii Dei meaning Sons of God. Most modern translations of Christian bibles retain this whereas Jewish ones tend to deviate to such as Sons of Rulers which may in part be due to Simeon ben Yohai who cursed anyone who translated this as "Sons of God" (Genesis Rabbah 26:7).

Beyond this  in both the Codices Job 1:6 and Deuteronomy 32:8 when the phrase "angels of God"  is used in place of where the Hebrew says "sons of God". For the verse in Deuteronomy the Masoretic Text does not say "sons of God" but "sons of Israel" however in 4Q37 the term "sons of God" is used. This is probably the root reading for the reading we see in the Septuagint.

Other mentions
The phrase "sons of the Elohim" also occurs in:

 Job 1:6 bənê hāʼĕlōhîm (בְּנֵי הָאֱלֹהִים) the sons of Elohim.
 Job 2:1 bənê hāʼĕlōhîm (בְּנֵי הָאֱלֹהִים) the sons of Elohim.
 Job 38:7 bənê ĕlōhîm (בְּנֵי אֱלֹהִֽים) without the definite article - sons of Elohim.
 Deuteronomy 32:8 both bənê ĕlōhîm (בְּנֵי הָאֱלֹהִים) and bənê ĕl (בני אל) the sons of Elohim or sons of El in two Dead Sea Scrolls (4QDtj and 4QDtq); mostly "angels of God" (αγγελων θεου) in the LXX (sometimes "sons of God" or "sons of Israel"); "sons of Israel" in the MT.

Closely related phrases include: 
 Psalms 29:1 bənê ēlîm (בְּנֵי אֵלִים) without the definite article - sons of elim (a similar expression).
Psalms 82:6 bənê elîon (בְּנֵי עֶלְיוֹן) without the definite article and using ‘Most high’ instead of ēl.
 Psalms 89:6 bənê ēlîm (בְּנֵי אֵלִים) - sons of elim
 A closely related Aramaic expression occurs in Daniel 3:25: bar elahin - בַר אֱלָהִֽין - Son of God.

Second Temple Judaism (c. 500 BCE – 70 CE)

The Book of Enoch, the Enochic Book of Giants, and the Book of Jubilees refer to the Watchers who are paralleled to the "sons of God" in Genesis 6. The Epistle of Barnabas is considered by some to acknowledge the Enochian version.

Interpretation

Christian antiquity
Christian writers such as Justin Martyr, Eusebius, Clement of Alexandria, Origen, and Commodianus believed that the "sons of God" in Genesis 6:1–4 were fallen angels who engaged in unnatural union with human women, resulting in the begetting of the Nephilim. Some scholars view Jesus' comment in  that angels in heaven do not marry, as a refutation to this view. 

Other early Christians believed that the "sons of God" in Genesis 6:1–4 were the descendants of Seth. Augustine of Hippo subscribed to this view, based on the Chronographiai of Julius Africanus in his book City of God, which refer to the "sons of God" as being descendants of Seth (or Sethites), the pure line of Adam. The "daughters of men" are viewed as the descendants of Cain (or Cainites). Variations of this view were also received by Jewish philosophers.

Medieval Judaism 
Traditionalists and philosophers of Judaism in the Middle Ages typically practiced rational theology. They rejected any belief in rebel or fallen angels since evil was considered abstract. Rabbinic sources, most notably the Targum, state that the "sons of God" who married the daughters of men were merely human beings of exalted social station. They have also been considered as pagan royalty or members of nobility who, out of lust, married women from the general population. Other variations of this interpretation define these "sons of God" as tyrannical Ancient Near Eastern kings who were honored as divine rulers, engaging in polygamous behavior. No matter the variation in views, the primary concept by Jewish rationalists is that the "sons of God" were of human origin.

Most notable Jewish writers in support for the view of human "sons of God" were 
Saadia, Rashi, Lekah Tob, Midrash Aggada, Joseph Bekor Shor, Abraham ibn Ezra, Maimonides, David Kimhi, Nahmanides, Hizkuni, Bahya Ashur. Gersonides, Shimeon ben Yochai, and Hillel ben Samuel.

Ibn Ezra reasoned that the "sons of God" were men who possessed divine power, by means of astrological knowledge, able to beget children of unusual size and strength.

Jewish commentator Isaac Abrabanel considered the aggadot on Genesis 6 to have referred to some secret doctrine and was not to be taken literally. Abrabanel later joined Nahmanides and Levi ben Gerson in promoting the concept that the "sons of God" were the older generations who were closer to physical perfection, as Adam and Eve were perfect. Though there are variations of this view, the primary idea was that Adam and Eve's perfect attributes were passed down from generation to generation. However, as each generation passed, their perfect physical attributes diminished. Thus, the early generations were mightier than the succeeding ones. The physical decline of the younger generations continued until the Flood, to the point that their days were numbered as stated in Genesis 6:3. It was immoral for the older generations to consort with the younger generations, whereby puny women begot unusually large children. Nephilim was even considered a stature.

Jacob Anatoli and Isaac Arama viewed the groups and events in Genesis 6:1–4 as an allegory, primarily for the sin of lust that declined man's higher nature.

See also
 Angel of the Lord
 Anunnaki
 Archangel
 List of angels in theology

Footnotes

References

Darshan, Guy "The Story of the Sons of God and the Daughters of Men: Gen.6:1–4 and the Hesiodic Catalogue of Women", Shnaton: An Annual for Biblical and Ancient Near Eastern Studies 23 (2014), 155–178 (in Hebrew; Eng. abstract)

External links
 Catholic Encyclopedia: "Son of God"
 Jewish Encyclopedia: "Son of God"

Angels
Angels in Christianity
Angels in Judaism
Book of Genesis people
Classes of angels
Hebrew Bible words and phrases
Religious terminology
Book of Jubilees
Nephilim